The 1921-22 J. & P. Coats F.C. season was the club's first season in the American Soccer League and the inaugural season of the league. The club previously played in the Southern New England Soccer League. J. & P. Coats F.C. finished 5th in the league.

American Soccer League

Pld = Matches played; W = Matches won; D = Matches drawn; L = Matches lost; GF = Goals for; GA = Goals against; Pts = Points

National Challenge Cup

Notes and references
Bibliography

Notes

Footnotes

J. & P. Coats F.C.
American Soccer League (1921–1933) seasons
J. & P. Coats F.C.